Sophie LaRochelle is a Canada Research Chair and professor of engineering at the Université Laval.  She specializes in developing fiber optic components for signal-processing and data transmission in telecommunication networks.

Education 
LaRochelle earned a Ph.D. in Optics from the University of Arizona College of Optical Sciences in 1992. Her thesis, "Origin and applications of photosensitivity in germanium‐doped silica optical fibers", was supervised by George I. Stegman. She obtained her M.Sc. in Physics and B.Sc. in Engineering Physics from the Université Laval.

Research and career 
LaRochelle was appointed to the faculty of the Department of Electrical and Computer Engineering at the Université Laval in 1996. Prior to her appointment at Université Laval, she was a Defense Scientist at DRDC Valcartier. She was appointed by Canada's Minister of Science to the Governing Council for the Natural Sciences and Engineering Research Council of Canada in 2015. Currently, LaRochelle is the Director of the Center for Optics, Photonics and Lasers (COPL), a multi-institutional research network in the Province of Quebec.

LaRochelle's research activities focus on optical fiber components, fiber laser systems, integrated photonics, and optical networking. She has made significant contributions to the development of passive and active fiber devices and their application to optical signal processing. She is known for inventing fiber optic components including super-structured fiber Bragg gratings for chromatic dispersion equalizers, multi-wavelength fiber lasers and optical code division multiplexing. Her work has been published in more than 150 scientific articles and she has directed the research work of over 70 graduate students and post-doctoral fellows.

Awards and honors 
LaRochelle was Holder of the Canada Research Chair (Tier 2) in Optical Fiber Communications and Components from 2000–2010. Since 2012, she has been Holder of the Canada Research Chair (Tier 1) in Advanced Photonics Technologies for Communications. She was inducted as a Senior Member of the Institute of Electrical and Electronics Engineers (IEEE) in 2013 and as a Fellow of the Optical Society in 2015. LaRochelle was elected to the Board of Directors of The Optical Society in 2019 and will serve through 2021.

References 

Canada Research Chairs
Fellows of Optica (society)
University of Arizona alumni
Women in optics
Université Laval alumni
Academic staff of Université Laval
Fiber optics
Year of birth missing (living people)
Living people
Optical engineers
Telecommunications engineers